The white-shouldered antshrike (Thamnophilus aethiops) is a species of bird in the family Thamnophilidae. It is found in Bolivia, Brazil, Colombia, Ecuador, Peru, and Venezuela.  Its natural habitat is subtropical or tropical moist lowland forests.

The white-shouldered antshrike was described by the English zoologist Philip Sclater in 1858 and given the binomial name Thamnophilus aethiops.

References

white-shouldered antshrike
Birds of the Amazon Basin
white-shouldered antshrike
white-shouldered antshrike
Taxonomy articles created by Polbot